Regenerative economics is an economic system that works to regenerate capital assets. A capital asset is an asset that provides goods and/or services that are required for, or contribute to, our well-being. In standard economic theory, one can either “regenerate” one's capital assets or consume them until the point where the asset cannot produce a viable stream of goods and/or services. What sets regenerative economics apart from standard economic theory is that it takes into account and gives hard economic value to the principal or original capital assets — the earth and the sun. Most of Regenerative Economics focuses on the earth and the goods and services it supplies.

Regenerative economics is completely comfortable within the capitalist economic framework. Recognizing the earth as the original capital asset places the true value on the human support system known as the environment. Not having this original value properly recognized has created the unsustainable economic condition referred to as uneconomic growth, a phrase coined by leading ecological economist and steady-state theorist Herman Daly, as stated in the book Reshaping the Built Environment: Ecology, Ethics, and Economics. The authors of the regenerative economic theory believe that uneconomic growth is the opposite of regenerative economics.

Also see
 Circular economy

References

External links
Capital Institute
Center for the Advancement of the Steady State Economy
Net energy analysis Encyclopedia of Earth

Ecological economics
Environmental economics
Economic theories